Nzubechi Grace Nwokocha  (born 7 April 2001) is a Nigerian sprinter, a multiple time national champion over 100 metres.

In 2021, she posted a new personal best time in the 100m of 11.09 and, in the process, became the first Nigerian athlete to qualify for the delayed 2020 Tokyo Olympics. She also won the 100m at the National Sports Festival in Benin.

At the Athletics at the 2020 Summer Olympics – Women's 100 metres, she ran a new personal best time of 11.00 seconds in her heat to qualify for the semi-finals.

In 2022 she came sixth in the final of the NCAA championship in both the 100 metres and the 200 metres. She entered both the 100m and the 200m at the 2022 World Athletics Championships and reached the semi-finals at both events. She also won the Nigerian National Championships over 100 metres.

On 3 September 2022, she was provisionally suspended for the use of banned substances Ostarine and Ligandrol by the Athletics Integrity Unit (AIU).

References

2001 births
Living people
Nigerian female sprinters
Igbo people
Athletes (track and field) at the 2020 Summer Olympics
Olympic athletes of Nigeria
Olympic female sprinters
North Carolina A&T Aggies women's track and field athletes
Athletes (track and field) at the 2022 Commonwealth Games
21st-century Nigerian women
Commonwealth Games gold medallists for Nigeria
Commonwealth Games medallists in athletics
Nigerian sportspeople in doping cases
Doping cases in athletics
Medallists at the 2022 Commonwealth Games